Ben Bradley (born 1971) is an American philosopher and Anita and Allan D. Sutton Distinguished Professor of Philosophy at Syracuse University.
He is known for his works on ethical theory and philosophy of death.

Bradley is an editor-in-chief of Ergo.

Books
 Well-Being. Polity Press, 2015
 The Oxford Handbook of Philosophy of Death, co-edited with Fred Feldman and Jens Johansson, Oxford University Press. 2012
 Well-Being and Death. Oxford: Clarendon Press. 2009

References

External links

Living people
21st-century American philosophers
Syracuse University faculty
1971 births
University of Massachusetts Amherst alumni
Lawrence University alumni
Distinguished professors of philosophy
Philosophers of death